Marcus Valerius Volusus (or Volesus, sometimes referred to as M. Valerius Volusus Maximus) was a Roman consul with Publius Postumius Tubertus in 505 BC.

He was the son of Volesus Valerius and brother to Publius Valerius Publicola (consul in 509, 508, 507, and 504 BC) and Manius Valerius Maximus (dictator in 494 BC).

During his consulship in 505 BC he successfully conducted war with the Sabines and both consuls were awarded triumphs. After his consulship he was sent in 501 BC as an ambassador to Ferentium to hinder a new war with the Latins.

In around 496 BC (alternative dating includes 499 BC, 493 BC and 489 BC) he was involved in the fight against the Latins (who were accompanied by Tarquinius Superbus and his son Titus Tarquinius) at the Battle of Lake Regillus.  During the battle, Valerius charged Titus in an attempt to slay him, but was himself killed by Titus' men.

Some contradiction exists in the regards to his death at the Battle of Lake Regillus as in a few sources he is mentioned as being elected augur in 494 BC. 

His son Lucius was consul in 483 BC and 470 BC. He might have had a second son, named Manius, who according to a dubious account by Festus was dictator in 501 BC and who could possibly be the augur mentioned as having died in 463 BC.

Sources
Livy, Ab urbe condita, 1:58, 2:16, 2:18-2:20.
Plutarch, Parallel Lives: Poplicola.
William Smith (lexicographer), Dictionary of Greek and Roman Biography and Mythology

References 

6th-century BC Roman consuls
Volusus, Marcus
490s BC deaths
Year of death uncertain
Year of birth unknown